Scorton may refer to several places in the United Kingdom:

 Scorton, Lancashire
 Scorton, North Yorkshire